Kshitish Chandra Neogy (1888–1970), also known as KC Neogy, was an Indian politician from West Bengal. He was a member of the Constituent Assembly of India, member of the first Cabinet of independent India and the chairman of the first Finance Commission of India.

Neogy was a member of the Indian National Congress and was elected as a member of the Central Legislative Assembly in  1920, 1923, 1926, 1930 representing Bengal and was returned to the assembly in successive elections. He held a number of important posts in Government of India including Chairman of the Planning Advisory Board and Indian Railway Enquiry Committee. He attended the Round Table Conferences representing the Orissa States. He was also a member of the United Nations Commission on Human Rights.
 
Neogy was elected as a member of the Constituent Assembly of India and after independence became a member of the First Cabinet of Independent India under Jawaharlal Nehru as the Minister of Relief and Rehabilitation and later as Minister for Commerce.  After the resignation of R. K. Shanmukham Chetty, Neogy took charge as the second Finance Minister of India in 1950. He held office for just 35 days and did not get an opportunity to present a Budget  since he resigned along with Syama Prasad Mookerjee.

On 22 November 1951, Neogy was appointed by the President of India as the chairman of the first Finance Commission of India.

Neogy had three children with his wife, Lila. His eldest son, Prithwish Neogy (1918–91), was a professor of art history at the University of Hawaii at Manoa, USA.

References

External links

1888 births
1970 deaths
Members of the Central Legislative Assembly of India
People from West Bengal
Members of the Constituent Assembly of India
Finance Ministers of India
Commerce and Industry Ministers of India